The Bagdad Village Historic District is a U.S. historic district (designated as such on December 8, 1987) located in Bagdad, Florida. The district is bounded by Main, Water, & Oak Streets, Cobb & Woodville Roads, Cemetery, Pooley, & School Streets. It contains 143 historic buildings.

References

External links
 Santa Rosa County listings at National Register of Historic Places

National Register of Historic Places in Santa Rosa County, Florida
Historic districts on the National Register of Historic Places in Florida